HMS Childers was a Royal Navy 18-gun Cruizer-class brig-sloop that Nicholas Diddams built at Portsmouth Dockyard and launched in 1812. She was broken up in 1822.

Royal Navy service
Commander Buckland Bluett commissioned Childers in July 1812. When news of the outbreak of the War of 1812 reached Britain, the Royal Navy seized all American vessels then in British ports. Childers was among the 42 Royal Navy vessels then lying at Spithead or Portsmouth and so entitled to share in the grant for the American ships Belleville, Janus, Aeos, Ganges and Leonidas seized there on 31 July 1812.

Commander John Bedford replaced Bluett in August and sailed for the Leeward Islands on 29 September. Snapper was a privateer of 172 tons, out of Philadelphia. She carried 11 guns and had a crew of 90 men under the command of Captain J. Green. That same day Childers captured the brig Isabella, which was sailing from New York to Puerto Rico. Some six weeks later, on 16 December, Childers captured the brig Baltimore, which was on her way to Bermuda.

From December 1813 onwards, she was under Commander John Brand Umfreville. In September 1814, she took part in the first, unsuccessful attack on Fort Bowyer. For much of the autumn, Carron was at Pensacola, until General Andrew Jackson's numerically superior forces expelled the British in the battle of Pensacola at the start of November 1814.

n 27 January 1815 Childers left Nassau, Bahamas, escorting a convoy to Britain.

Commander Richard Wales assumed command in October 1815, in the Leeward Islands. Lieutenant Edward W. Corry Astley (acting) assumed command in September 1816 while Wales was ill, giving up command on Wales's return. During Astley's command, yellow fever attacked the crew of Childers, forcing him to bring her into English Harbour, Antigua, with only 15 men available for duty. According to The Naval Chronicle, within a month she lost over 35 officers and men dead from fever.

In January 1817 Commander Amos Freeman Westropp assumed command.

Fate
Childers was broken up at Chatham on 7 March 1822.

Notes, citations, and references
Notes

Citations

References
Eaton, John Henry, and Jerome Van Crowninshield Smith (1834) Memoirs of Andrew Jackson: late major general and commander in chief of the Southern division of the army of the United States. (Philadelphia)
James, William (1818) A Full and Correct Account of the Military Occurrences of the Late War Between Great Britain and the United States of America. (London, Printed for the Author). .
Latour, Arsène Lacarrière (1816) Historical memoir of the war in West Florida and Louisiana in 1814-15. (Philadelphia: John Conrad & Co)
Lossing, Benson J. (1869) Pictorial Field-Book of the War of 1812.

External links
 Michael Phillips' Ships of the Old Navy
 The letters that Captain John Brand Umfreville of the Royal Navy wrote and received while commanding HMS Childers, held at The University of Michigan
 Transcript of the log for HMS Childers, reference ADM 52/4443, for Thursday 15 September 1814
 

Brigs of the Royal Navy
Cruizer-class brig-sloops
1812 ships
War of 1812 ships of the United Kingdom